Caprettia is a genus of lichenized fungi in the family Monoblastiaceae. The genus was circumscribed by Augusto Chaves Batista and Heraldo da Silva Maia in 1965, with Caprettia amazonensis assigned as the type species.

The genus name of Caprettia is in honour of Corrado Capretti (1915–1960), an Italian botanist and professor at University of the Andes (Venezuela) in 1956.

Species
Caprettia amazonensis 
Caprettia confusa 
Caprettia goderei 
Caprettia lichexanthotricha 
Caprettia neotropica 
Caprettia nyssogenoides 
Caprettia ornata

References

Dothideomycetes
Dothideomycetes genera
Lichen genera
Taxa described in 1965